Never Stop Singing is a one-hour public television documentary film  produced by Peter B Myers about choral music in Minnesota that premiered on Twin Cities Public Television (TPT) on June 7, 2009. The film was produced by Peter Myers and co-produced and edited by Skip Davis between February 2008 and April 2009. The documentary includes video from more than 40 interviews with well-known Minnesota composers, conductors, and singers.

Synopsis
The film documents through interviews and examples, the work of Minnesota musicians Dominick Argento, Anton Armstrong, Philip Brunelle, David Cherwien, Rene Clausen, Stephen Paulus, Robert Robinson, Kathy Romey, Dale Warland and other composers who share their passion for the choral arts, and includes performance excerpts featuring Cantus, Minnesota Chorale, and Twin Cities Community Gospel Choir, among others.

Reception
 In 2010, the documentary won an "Arts & Entertainment Program" Upper Midwest Regional Emmy Award as presented by the National Academy of Television Arts and Sciences.

References

External links
 
 Never Stop Singing at Twin Cities Public Television

2000s American television specials
2009 television specials
Documentary films about music and musicians
Choral music
Films shot in Minnesota
Music of Minnesota
2000s English-language films